The 2022 BWF World Tour Finals (officially known as the HSBC BWF World Tour Finals 2022 for sponsorship reasons) was the final tournament of the 2022 BWF World Tour. It was scheduled to be held from 14 to 18 December 2022 in Guangzhou, China but was later moved to Bangkok, Thailand, and held a week earlier – from 7 to 11 December 2022 – due to the COVID-19 pandemic in China. It had a total prize of $1,500,000.

Tournament 
The 2022 BWF World Tour was the fifth edition of the BWF World Tour Finals and was originally scheduled to be organized by the Guangzhou Sports Bureau, Guangzhou Sports Competitions Centre, Guangzhou Badminton Administrative Centre, and Guangzhou Badminton Association. It would have been hosted by the Chinese Badminton Association and Guangzhou Municipal Government with sanction from the BWF.

Due to the uncertainties caused by the COVID-19 pandemic in China, the tournament was relocated to Thailand. It was then hosted by the Badminton Association of Thailand.

Venue 
This international tournament was originally planned to be held at the Tianhe Gymnasium in Tianhe, Guangzhou, China. It was later relocated to Nimibutr Arena in Bangkok, Thailand, due to the circumstances in regard of the COVID-19 pandemic in China.

Point distribution 
Below is the point distribution table for each phase of the tournament based on the BWF points system for the BWF World Tour Finals event.

Prize money 
The total prize money for this year's tournament was US$1,500,000. Distribution of prize money was in accordance with BWF regulations.

Tie-breaking criteria
Players or pairs was ranked according to points (1 point for a win, 0 points for a loss). If two players/pairs were tied on points, the result of head-to-head match among the tied players/pairs was used to determine the rankings. If more than two players/pairs were tied, and after applying the head-to-head criteria above, a subset of players/pairs were still tied, the criteria above was reapplied exclusively to this subset of players/pairs;
Game difference in all group matches; if two players/pairs still tied, then reapply the head-to-head criteria above;
Point difference in all group matches; if two players/pairs still tied, then reapply the head-to-head criteria above;
Drawing of lots if three or more players/pairs still tied.

Representatives

Eligible players 
Below are the eligible players for World Tour Finals.

Men's singles

Women's singles

Men's doubles

Women's doubles

Mixed doubles

Representatives by nation

Performances by nation

Men's singles

Seeds 

 Viktor Axelsen (champion)
 Chou Tien-chen (group stage)
 Prannoy H. S. (group stage)
 Jonatan Christie (semi-finals)

Group A

Group B

Finals

Women's singles

Seeds 

 Chen Yufei (semi-finals)
 Tai Tzu-ying (final)
 He Bingjiao (semi-finals)
 An Se-young (group stage)

Group A

Group B

Finals

Men's doubles

Seeds 

 Fajar Alfian / Muhammad Rian Ardianto (semi-finals)
 Mohammad Ahsan / Hendra Setiawan (final)
 Ong Yew Sin / Teo Ee Yi (semi-finals)
 Liu Yuchen / Ou Xuanyi (champions)

Group A

Group B

Finals

Women's doubles

Seeds 

 Jeong Na-eun / Kim Hye-jeong (semi-finals)
 Zhang Shuxian / Zheng Yu (semi-finals)
 Benyapa Aimsaard / Nuntakarn Aimsaard (final)
 Chen Qingchen / Jia Yifan (champions)

Group A

Group B

Finals

Mixed doubles

Seeds 

 Zheng Siwei / Huang Yaqiong (champions)
 Dechapol Puavaranukroh / Sapsiree Taerattanachai (final)
 Wang Yilyu / Huang Dongping (group stage)
 Goh Soon Huat / Shevon Jemie Lai (group stage)

Group A

Group B

Finals

References

External links 
Tournament link
BWF World Tour Finals website
BWF World Tour website

BWF World Tour Finals
2022 in Thai sport
Badminton tournaments in Thailand
BWF World Tour Finals
Impact of the COVID-19 pandemic on sports
International sports competitions hosted by Thailand
Sports competitions in Bangkok